Carmine Church is a Roman Catholic building which is located in via  (formerly via Alberica) in Carrara.

History
The church began construction in the 16th century, but was completed in Baroque style, modified by style of the Ligurian region. On the portal is an sculpture of Madonna and Child, attributed to Bartolomeo Ordoñez (1515–1520). The church houses a painting depicting a Madonna del Carmine (Our Lady of Mount Carmel, 16th century), attributed to Domenico Fiasella. It also contains the altar dedicated to Santa Maria Maddelena de'Pazzi, built in 1675 at the expense of Count Francesco Maria Diana.

External links
La scheda su toscana.it
Carmine Church

Churches in the province of Massa and Carrara
16th-century Roman Catholic church buildings in Italy
Carrara